Hartcher is a surname. Notable people with the surname include:

Chris Hartcher (born 1946), Australian politician
Peter Hartcher (born 1963), Australian journalist

See also
Hatcher